Vermilion Dam is an unincorporated community in Saint Louis County, Minnesota, United States.

The community is located 21 miles northeast of Cook, near the junction of Saint Louis County Road 24 and County Road 422.

Vermilion Dam is located within the Kabetogama State Forest.

References

 Official State of Minnesota Highway Map – 2011/2012 edition

Unincorporated communities in Minnesota
Unincorporated communities in St. Louis County, Minnesota